The Shire of Murrindindi is a local government area in the Hume region of Victoria, Australia, located in the north-east part of the state. It includes the towns of Alexandra, Buxton, Eildon, Flowerdale, Kinglake, Marysville, Molesworth, Strath Creek, Taggerty, Yarck and Yea. It was formed in 1994 from the amalgamation of the Shire of Alexandra, Shire of Yea, and parts of the Shire of Broadford, Shire of Eltham, Shire of Euroa, Shire of Healesville and City of Whittlesea.

The Shire is governed by the Murrindindi Shire Council; its seat of local government and administrative centre is located at the council headquarters in Alexandra, it also has service centres located in Kinglake and Yea. The Shire is named after the locality of Murrindindi, which is located near the geographical centre of the LGA.

Parts of Murrindindi were badly affected by the 2009 Victorian bushfires, notably the towns of Marysville and Kinglake. In total, 106 people died across the Shire including 38 in Kinglake and 34 in Marysville.

The Lake Mountain ski resort is an unincorporated area near the southern border of the shire, which creates a small exclave.

Council

Current composition
The council is composed of seven wards and seven councillors, with one councillor elected to represent each ward.

Administration and governance
The Council meets on a monthly basis for Scheduled Meetings and from time to time for Unscheduled Meetings. The meetings are streamed live on Council's Facebook page. Council provides customer services from its Library and Customer Service Centres in Alexandra, Kinglake and Yea and also from its Mobile Library and Customer Service.

Media

Murrindindi Shire activities are covered weekly in local print publications and also on local radio UGFM. The latest information is also made available on Council's website and Facebook pages.

Townships and localities
The 2021 census, the shire had a population of 15,197 up from 13,732 in the 2016 census

^ - Territory divided with another LGA

See also

 List of localities (Victoria)
 List of places on the Victorian Heritage Register in the Shire of Murrindindi

References

Local government areas of Victoria (Australia)
Hume (region)